Oban is the principal settlement on Stewart Island / Rakiura, the southernmost inhabited island of the New Zealand archipelago. Oban is located on Halfmoon Bay (sometimes used as an alternative name for the town), on Paterson Inlet. It has aircraft connections with Invercargill and a ferry service to Bluff.

The settlement was named after Oban in Scotland, (An t-Òban in Scottish Gaelic, meaning The Little Bay), due to the strong influence Scottish settlers had in the south of early colonial New Zealand.

The island has received a moderate boost of commerce and some millions in government funding since tourism increased markedly after the opening of the Rakiura National Park.

Demographics
It is part of the wider Stewart Island statistical area.

Oban had a population of 300 at the 2018 New Zealand census, an increase of 27 people (9.9%) since the 2013 census, and an increase of 9 people (3.1%) since the 2006 census. There were 165 households. There were 156 males and 144 females, giving a sex ratio of 1.08 males per female, with 33 people (11.0%) aged under 15 years, 51 (17.0%) aged 15 to 29, 144 (48.0%) aged 30 to 64, and 69 (23.0%) aged 65 or older.

Ethnicities were 92.0% European/Pākehā, 19.0% Māori, 1.0% Pacific peoples, 1.0% Asian, and 1.0% other ethnicities (totals add to more than 100% since people could identify with multiple ethnicities).

Although some people objected to giving their religion, 65.0% had no religion, 26.0% were Christian, 1.0% were Buddhist and 3.0% had other religions.

Of those at least 15 years old, 66 (24.7%) people had a bachelor or higher degree, and 45 (16.9%) people had no formal qualifications. The employment status of those at least 15 was that 150 (56.2%) people were employed full-time, 42 (15.7%) were part-time, and 3 (1.1%) were unemployed.

Climate

The Köppen-Geiger climate classification system classifies its climate as a mid-latitude oceanic (Cfb). The strong oceanic influence here results in small temperature variations. Year-round, Oban lies in the direct path of mid-latitude cyclones (low-pressure systems, or depressions) arriving from the Southern Ocean, generally moving from southwest to northeast, or west to east. As such, the climate is predominantly windy, cloudy and rainy; clear days and days with calm to minimal wind are rare.

Education
Halfmoon Bay School / Te Kura o Rakiura  caters for years 1 to 8 with a roll of  students as of  The school celebrated its centenary in 1974.

References

Stewart Island
Populated places in Southland, New Zealand